This is a list of compositions for saxophone, piano and percussion.

History

Despite being a common grouping in jazz, saxophone, piano and percussion was an extremely rare grouping in classical music until the end of the 20th century, when Trio Accanto started commissioning works to build a repertoire for themselves. Since then, other groups have been formed to perform and further expand the repertoire, including Trio Abstrakt (Germany), TDM Trío De Magia (Spain), Polaris Trio (Spain), standardmodell (France) and Tamgram Trio (Spain).

Concerto Repertoire

Chamber Repertoire (Trio)

Chamber Repertoire (Trio plus)

References

Contemporary classical compositions